Mark Preston may refer to:

 Mark Preston (businessman) (born 1968), Australian businessman and motorsport professional
 Mark Preston (political analyst) (born 1971), American CNN senior political analyst and Executive Editor, CNN Politics